Martin Waud (born 13 February 1981) is a Caymanian footballer who plays as a defender. He has represented the Cayman Islands during World Cup qualifying matches in 2008.

References

Association football defenders
Living people
1981 births
Caymanian footballers
Cayman Islands international footballers
Sunset FC players